Kushki-ye Olya (also Romanized as Kūshkī-ye ‘Olyā and Gūshkī-ye ‘Olyā; also known as Gūshkī, Gūshkī-ye Bālā, Kūshkī, Kūshkī-ye Bālā) is a village in Oshtorinan Rural District, Oshtorinan District, Borujerd County, Lorestan Province, Iran. At the 2006 census, its population was 417, in 109 families.

References 

Towns and villages in Borujerd County